Dubrava is a rural locality (a village) in Pochepsky District, Bryansk Oblast, Russia. The population was 4 as of 2010. There is 1 street.

Geography 
Dubrava is located 30 km northwest of Pochep (the district's administrative centre) by road. Strelitsa is the nearest rural locality.

References 

Rural localities in Pochepsky District